Vartan Hovanessian (Persian:وارطان هوانسیان ,  1896 in Tabriz – 1982 in Tehran) was an Iranian Armenian architect and leading figure in architectural practice and philosophy.

He was born in Tabriz. After high school graduation, he developed an interest in design and worked as carpet designer in a German-owned carpet-weaving  workshop in Tabriz before moving to Tehran, where he began a career of teaching. By the end of World War One, he took a trip to Paris to study painting in a school for fine arts, but shifted, after a while, to architecture. He studied architecture in École Spéciale d'Architecture of Paris. Holding a degree in architecture, he returned home after 17 years and worked notably in the fields of civil engineering and building architecture. He always preferred the title, "Architect Vartan". He, Aka Architect Vartan, stood out as a prolific and well-known designer of his time and made prominent constructions like "Ferdowsi Hotel", "Central Building of Sepah Bank", and "Sa'ad Abad Royal Palace". His architectural triumph includes the construction of several movie halls including the "Metropol" and "Diana" movie-theaters. He died in 1982.

Projects 
Some his notable projects are:
 Metropol movie-theaters
 Diana movie-theaters
 Ferdowsi Hotel
 Darband Hotel
 Guest House of Tehran Railroad
 Central Building of Sepah Bank and its Isfahan Branch
 Shahreza Apartments
 Sa'ad Abad Royal Palace
 Jeep Building
 Girls’ Vocational School of Tehran

Publications 
His name frequently appeared on different magazines, including "The Architect" which had been published in Iran. Later, he founded the magazine, “The New Architecture” in Tehran.

References 

 

Ethnic Armenian architects
Iranian architects
People from Tabriz
Iranian people of Armenian descent
1896 births
1982 deaths
20th-century Iranian architects